Prentice is both a given name and a surname.

Prentice may also refer to:

 Prentice, Wisconsin, United States
 Prentice (town), Wisconsin, United States
 Prentice Plateau

See also

 Prentice Hall, an American book publishing company
 Prentice position
 Percival Prentice, British military trainer aircraft
 Justice Prentice (disambiguation)